Pittsburgh History and Landmarks Foundation (PHLF) Historic Landmark plaque program was begun in 1968 in order to identify architecturally significant structures and significant pieces of Pittsburgh's local heritage throughout Allegheny County. Nominations are reviewed by the private non-profit foundation's Historic Plaque Designation Committee composed of trustees, architectural historians, and citizens.

Beginning in 2010, the committee expanded its program to consider applications for historic status from counties surrounding Allegheny, extending its reach to a 250-mile radius from the city, as long as the site has a connection to the greater Pittsburgh region. Historic designation by the foundation does not protect the building from alteration or demolition. Structures awarded the designation typically have aluminum or bronze plaques affixed to their exterior that signify their status. Over 500 Historic Landmark Plaques have been awarded since the program's inception, although not all structures have been preserved. These designations are not to be confused with City of Pittsburgh historic designations. 

The table below lists all Pittsburgh History and Landmark Foundation Historic Landmark designations through 2014 initially sorted alphabetically by their official listing.

See also 
 List of City of Pittsburgh historic designations
 National Register of Historic Places listings in Pittsburgh, Pennsylvania
 National Register of Historic Places listings in Allegheny County, Pennsylvania
 List of Pennsylvania state historical markers in Allegheny County

References

External links 
 Pittsburgh History & Landmarks Foundation

Landmarks
Pittsburgh History & Landmarks Foundation Historic Landmarks
Historic Landmarks
Historic Landmarks